The Hunt is a 2015 British nature documentary series made for BBC Television, first shown in the UK on BBC One and BBC One HD on 1 November 2015. The series is narrated by David Attenborough.

The Hunt takes a detailed, audio-visual study of predator-prey relations—as well as the importance of respective ecosystems within a world facing greater environmental challenges brought about by the impact of the human race. Rather than simply concentrating on 'the blood and guts' of predatory behaviours typical of past documentary series, The Hunt focuses more upon the diverse strategies predators use to catch their food, and also the various evasive techniques prospective prey use to escape death by predator.

Each episode is based in one or more of the planet's key habitats—each of which presents the predators and their prey with often critical seasonal, climatic, and ecological-environmental challenges.

To conclude, the seventh episode examines the state of the planet from the perspective of the top predators and their ever increasingly difficult struggle to survive—and also considers the scientists and conservationists who are determined in their collective fight to protect them.

Broadcast

British television
The Hunt debuted on British television on 1 November 2015, broadcast on BBC One and BBC One HD, which consisted of total seven episodes.

International Release
The series was broadcast internationally on BBC Earth channel, and also commercial television channels in various countries, besides.

The series aired in Australia on 3 February 2016 on the Nine Network and in the Republic of Ireland from 5 June 2016 on RTÉ One/2 and RTÉ One HD/2.

In Estonia, the series aired each Saturday from 27 February 2016 and concluded on 9 April 2016 on ETV, locally titled Jaht: Aastaaegade haardes.

In Japan, the series aired from 3 May until 5 May 2016 under BBC Earth monthly programming blocks on WOWOW with the voiceover by Katsumi Chō in Japanese narration.

BBC America announced its first major natural history co-production in United States with a sneak peek review. The series began airing each Sunday from 3 July 2016.

Episodes

Merchandise

DVDs and Blu-ray
In United Kingdom, DVD (BBCDVD4060) and Blu-ray (BBCBD0315) has been released on 30 November 2015 by BBC Worldwide.

In Australia and New Zealand, DVD and Blu-ray were released by ABC DVD/Village Roadshow on 20 July 2016.

In North America and Canada, the DVD and Blu-ray box sets was released on 6 September 2016 by BBC Worldwide Americas.

Books
The Hunt accompanies the TV series and was released in hardcover format on 2 November 2015. It is written by Alastair Fothergill and Huw Cordey, with a foreword by David Attenborough. It was published by BBC Books.

In the US, the book was released on 14 June 2016 and published by the Yale University Press.

Open University Poster
Open Learn University offers a free poster at (http://www.open.edu/openlearn/tv-radio-events/tv/the-hunt#get-your-free-poster)

Soundtrack

The musical score and songs featured in the series were composed by Steven Price and conducted by Geoffrey Alexander, with the performed by the BBC Concert Orchestra. The soundtrack was released on 13 November 2015.

References

External links
 
 The Hunt at BBC Earth
 The Hunt at BBC Earth Asia
 The Hunt at BBC America
 

BBC high definition shows
2015 British television series debuts
2015 British television series endings
David Attenborough
BBC television documentaries
Documentary films about nature
English-language television shows